Adam Horowitz (born December 4, 1971) is an American screenwriter and producer. He is known for co-creating the ABC fairy tale drama series Once Upon a Time with his writing partner Edward Kitsis. Days after the show ended its seven-year run in 2018, Kitsis and Horowitz were announced as showrunners for Apple TV's Amazing Stories.

Early life 
Horowitz was born in New York City, and graduated from Hunter College High School in 1990. He attended University of Wisconsin–Madison and graduated with a B.A. in 1994, majoring in communication arts and political science. There he met his future collaborator, Edward Kitsis. Horowitz was writer and reporter for the Daily Cardinal student newspaper, writing as many as five articles in the same issue. He often caught editors off-guard with humorous leads or picking odd quotes. He worked on articles about spearfishing and the Exxon Valdez oil spill.

Career

Television 
After graduating, Kitsis and Horowitz traveled together to Los Angeles, and worked together on Fantasy Island, Felicity and Popular, before joining the Lost team halfway through the first season. He is married to Erin Barrett Horowitz.

Horowitz, Kitsis and the Lost writing staff won the Writers Guild of America (WGA) Award for Best Dramatic Series at the February 2006 ceremony for their work on the first and second seasons. They were nominated for the WGA Award for Best Dramatic Series again at the February 2007 ceremony for their work on the second and third seasons, at the February 2009 ceremony for the fourth season of Lost and at the February 2010 ceremony for the fifth season. They also wrote Confessions of an American Bride, a made-for-television movie. During Lost's run, he signed an overall deal with ABC Studios in 2007.

Horowitz and Kitsis created the ABC fantasy drama series Once Upon a Time, which began airing on October 23, 2011. The show focuses on a town which is actually a parallel world populated by fairytale characters who are unaware of their true identity. The two came up with the concept seven years prior to joining the staff of Lost, but wanted to wait until it ended before they focused on this project.

Kitsis and Horowitz also worked on the first four episodes of Tron: Uprising. He explains that he has used this chance to explore the Tron universe, particularly the life of a program under CLU's regime.

Kitsis, Horowitz, and Josh Gad will serve as creators and writers for a limited prequel series to Disney's 2017 film Beauty and the Beast. The series was conceived after the three had a discussion after the cancellation of their planned Disney+ series, Muppets Live Another Day. In December 2019, it was announced that Horowitz and Kitsis were working on a new TV show set in the world of fairy tales and Disney titled Epic. The pilot was picked up by ABC in January 2021, however it was dropped in August of the same year.

Film 
Kitsis and Horowitz worked as writers on early unused drafts of the Universal project Ouija, and co-wrote the film Tron: Legacy in 2010.

He frequently collaborates with a tightly knit group of film professionals which include J. J. Abrams, Damon Lindelof, Alex Kurtzman, Roberto Orci, Edward Kitsis, Andre Nemec, Josh Appelbaum, Jeff Pinkner, and Bryan Burk.

Credits 
 Dead of Summer, 2016 (with Edward Kitsis)
Episode 1.01 "Patience" (also with Ian Goldberg) (also as director)
Episode 1.03 "Mix Tape"
Episode 1.04 "Modern Love"
Episode 1.10 "She Talks to Angels"
 Once Upon a Time in Wonderland, 2013–2014 (with Edward Kitsis)
Episode 1.01 "Down the Rabbit Hole" (also with Zack Estrin and Jane Espenson)
Episode 1.08 "Home" (also with Zack Estrin)
Episode 1.13 "And They Lived..." (also with Zack Estrin)
 Tron: Uprising, 2012
 Episode 1.01 "Beck's Beginning" with Edward Kitsis
 Episode 1.02 "The Renegade, Part 1" with Kitsis (Story – Written by Kamran Pasha, Adam Nussdorf and Bill Wolkoff)
 Episode 1.03 "The Renegade, Part 2" with Kitsis (Story – Written by Kamran Pasha, Adam Nussdorf and Bill Wolkoff)
 Episode 1.04 "Blackout" with Kitsis
 Once Upon a Time, 2011–2018 (with Edward Kitsis)
Episode 1.01 "Pilot"
Episode 1.02 "The Thing You Love Most"
Episode 1.07 "The Heart Is a Lonely Hunter"
Episode 1.10 "7:15 A.M." (story with Kitsis, teleplay by Daniel T. Thomsen)
Episode 1.14 "Dreamy"
Episode 1.18 "The Stable Boy"
Episode 1.22 "A Land Without Magic"
Episode 2.01 "Broken"
Episode 2.05 "The Doctor"
Episode 2.09 "Queen of Hearts"
Episode 2.14 "Manhattan"
Episode 2.19 "Lacey"
Episode 2.22 "And Straight On 'til Morning"
Episode 3.01 "The Heart of the Truest Believer"
Episode 3.06 "Ariel"
Episode 3.11 "Going Home"
Episode 3.12 "New York City Serenade"
Episode 3.19 "A Curious Thing"
Episode 3.22 "There's No Place Like Home"
Episode 4.01 "A Tale of Two Sisters"
Episode 4.07 "The Snow Queen"
Episode 4.11 "Heroes and Villains"
Episode 4.12 "Darkness on the Edge of Town"
Episode 4.13 "Unforgiven" (as director)
Episode 4.21/22 "Operation Mongoose"
Episode 5.01 "The Dark Swan"
Episode 5.05 "Dreamcatcher"
Episode 5.11 "Swan Song"
Episode 5.12 "Souls of the Departed" (100th episode)
Episode 5.23 "An Untold Story"
Episode 6.01 "The Savior"
Episode 6.05 "Street Rats"
Episode 6.10 "Wish You Were Here"
Episode 6.11 "Tougher Than the Rest"
Episode 6.16 "Mother's Little Helper" (story with Kitsis, teleplay by Paul Karp)
Episode 6.21/22 "The Final Battle"
Episode 7.01 "Hyperion Heights"
Episode 7.11 "Secret Garden"
Episode 7.19 "Flower Child"
Episode 7.22 "Leaving Storybrooke" (series finale)
 Tron: Legacy, 2010 (with Edward Kitsis)
 Lost, 2005–2010
 Episode 1.22 "Born to Run" teleplay with Edward Kitsis, story by Javier Grillo-Marxuach
 Episode 2.04 "Everybody Hates Hugo" with Kitsis
 Episode 2.12 "Fire and Water" with Kitsis
 Episode 2.18 "Dave" with Kitsis
 Episode 2.22 "Three Minutes" with Kitsis
 Episode 3.04 "Every Man for Himself" with Kitsis
 Episode 3.10 "Tricia Tanaka Is Dead" with Kitsis
 Episode 3.14 "Exposé" with Kitsis
 Episode 3.18 "D.O.C." with Kitsis
 Episode 3.21 "Greatest Hits" with Kitsis
 Episode 4.03 "The Economist" with Kitsis
 Episode 4.07 "Ji Yeon" with Kitsis
 Episode 4.10 "Something Nice Back Home" with Kitsis
 Episode 5.02 "The Lie" with Kitsis
 Episode 5.05 "This Place Is Death" with Kitsis
 Episode 5.10 "He's Our You" with Kitsis
 Episode 5.14 "The Variable" with Kitsis
 Episode 6.02 "What Kate Does" with Kitsis
 Episode 6.07 "Dr. Linus" with Kitsis
 Episode 6.12 "Everybody Loves Hugo" with Kitsis
 Episode 6.16 "What They Died For" with Kitsis and Elizabeth Sarnoff
 Confessions of an American Bride, 2005 with Edward Kitsis
 Life as We Know It, 2004
 Episode 1.08 "Family Hard-ships" with Edward Kitsis
 One Tree Hill, 2004
 Episode 1.20 "What Is and What Should Never Be" with Edward Kitsis
 Black Sash, 2003
 Episode 1.04 "Prodigal Son" with Edward Kitsis
 Birds of Prey, 2002–2003
 Episode 1.03 "Prey for the Hunter" teleplay with Edward Kitsis, story by Adam Armus & Kay Foster
 Episode 1.06 "Primal Scream" teleplay with Kitsis, story by Adam Armus & Kay Foster
 Episode 1.07 "Split" teleplay with Kitsis, story by Adam Armus & Kay Foster
 Episode 1.08 "Lady Shiva" teleplay with Kitsis, story by Adam Armus & Kay Foster
 Episode 1.11 "Reunion" with Kitsis
 Felicity, 2001
 Episode 4.03 "Your Money or Your Wife" with Edward Kitsis
 Episode 4.09 "Moving On" with Kitsis
 Popular, 1999–2001
 Episode 1.08 "Tonight's the Night" with Edward Kitsis and Ryan Murphy
 Episode 1.15 "Booty Camp" with Kitsis
 Episode 1.21 "What Makes Sammy Run" with Kitsis
 Episode 2.02 "Baby, Don't Do It" with Kitsis
 Episode 2.07 "Ur-ine Trouble" with Kitsis
 Episode 2.12 "The Shocking Possession of Harrison John" with Kitsis
 Episode 2.15 "It's Greek to Me" with Kitsis
 Episode 2.20 "You Don't Tug on Superman's Cape...You Don't Spit into the Wind...You Don't Pull the Mask off the Ol' Lone Ranger...And You Don't Mess Around with Big Bertha Muffin" with Kitsis
 Fantasy Island, 1998–1999
 Episode 1.02 "Superfriends" with Edward Kitsis
 Episode 1.08 "Handymen" with Kitsis
 Episode 1.12 "The Real Thing" with Kitsis
 Untitled Beauty and the Beast series (with Kitsis and Josh Gad)

Awards 
 2005 Writers Guild of America Award for Best Dramatic Series for Lost.
 2000 SHINE Award for Best Comedy Episode for Popular episode "Booty Camp".
 Nominated for 2000 Shine Award for Best Dramatic Episode for Popular episode "Tonight's the Night".
 Nominated for 2008 Primetime Emmy for Outstanding Drama Series for Lost
 Nominated for 2009 Primetime Emmy for Outstanding Drama Series for Lost
 Nominated for 2010 Primetime Emmy for Outstanding Drama Series for Lost

References

External links 

 

1971 births
American male screenwriters
Television producers from New York City
Hunter College High School alumni
Living people
Jewish American screenwriters
University of Wisconsin–Madison College of Letters and Science alumni
Writers Guild of America Award winners
Writers from Manhattan
Screenwriters from New York (state)
20th-century American screenwriters
20th-century American male writers
21st-century American screenwriters
21st-century American male writers
Showrunners
21st-century American Jews